This is a list of Islamic schools that operate within the Australian state of New South Wales. Entry to these schools is managed by each school individually, with religion being a primary criterion. Some schools (such as Malek Fahd Islamic School) may be selective in addition to being an Islamic School.

See also

List of Islamic schools in Australia

References

Islamic

New South Wales
New South Wales